The Pandora River is a river in Fiordland, New Zealand. It rises south of Mount Namu and flows north-westward into Te Awa-o-Tū / Thompson Sound.

See also
List of rivers of New Zealand

References

Rivers of Fiordland